Grand Prairie is a city in Dallas, Tarrant, and Ellis counties of Texas, in the United States. It is part of the Mid-Cities region in the Dallas–Fort Worth metroplex. It had a population of 175,396 according to the 2010 census, making it the fifteenth most populous city in the state. Remaining the 15th-most populous city in Texas, the 2020 census reported a population of 196,100.

History

The city of Grand Prairie was first established as Dechman by Alexander McRae Dechman in 1863. He based the name of the town on Big Prairie, Ohio. Prior to then, he resided in Young County near Fort Belknap. The 1860 U.S. Federal Census—Slave Schedules shows an A McR Dechman as having 4 slaves, ages 50, 25, 37 and 10. Dechman learned that he could trade his oxen and wagons for land in Dallas County. He tried to establish a home on the property, but ran into difficulties, so he returned to his family in Birdville before joining in the Civil War.

After the war, he returned to Birdville for two years before selling that farm in 1867 and moving to Houston, where yellow fever broke out, causing the family to settle in Bryan. In 1876, Dechman traded half his "prairie" property to the T&P Railroad to ensure the railroad came through the town. The railroad named the depot "Dechman", prompting its namesake to relocate his home from Bryan to Dechman. His son Alexander had been living in Dechman and operating a trading post and farm. The first church in the area was the Good Hope Cumberland Sabbath School, established in 1870 by Rev. Andrew Hayter. The church was later renamed West Fork United Presbyterian Church and remains an active church.

The first U.S. post office opened in 1877 under the name "Deckman" rather than "Dechman", because the U.S. Postal Service couldn't read the writing on the form completed to open the post office. Later that same year, after the Postal Service had adopted the "Deckman" name, confusion resulted from the T&P Railroad designation "Grand Prairie". This name was based on maps drawn from around 1850 through 1858 that labeled the area between Dallas and Fort Worth "the grand prairie of Texas". In order to alleviate the confusion, the Postal Service named the post office "Grand Prairie".

The town of Grand Prairie was eventually incorporated as a city in 1909. During World War I and since, Grand Prairie has had a long history with the defense and aviation industry. While the present-day Vought plant on Jefferson Avenue is part of a small strip within the Dallas city limits, it was originally in Grand Prairie. During World War II the North American Aviation Plant B produced the Consolidated B-24 Liberator and the P-51C and K Mustang variants. After the war, Vought Aircraft took over the plant. This later became Ling Temco Vought (LTV) and then eventually returned to the Vought moniker. The plant was the production site for the F-8 Crusader and the A-7 Corsair II aircraft of the 1950–1989 time period. The LTV Missile and Space division produced missiles such as the Scout and MLRS. This division was eventually sold to Lockheed Martin, which continues to operate in Grand Prairie. Grand Prairie was also the North American headquarters for Aérospatiale Helicopter. This company eventually became Airbus Helicopters, Inc., the U.S. subsidiary of Airbus Helicopters.

Vehement debate ensued, and the legal pressure from cities like Arlington, Duncanville and Irving wound up overturning part of the annexation attempt.

Geography
Grand Prairie is located along the border between Tarrant and Dallas counties, with a small portion extending south into Ellis County. The city is bordered by Dallas to the east, Cedar Hill and Midlothian to the southeast, Mansfield to the southwest, Arlington to the west, Fort Worth to the northwest, and Irving to the north.

The West Fork of the Trinity River and a major tributary, Johnson Creek, flow through Grand Prairie.

Grand Prairie has a long history of flooding from Johnson Creek. In the 1980s, a major Army Corps of Engineers project was begun to straighten the channel, which has reduced the damage of flooding.

Climate 
Grand Prairie is part of the humid subtropical region.

Demographics

As of the 2020 United States census, there were 196,100 people, 62,679 households, and 46,391 families residing in the city.

Government

Local government

According to the city's 2007–2008 Comprehensive Annual Financial Report, the city's various funds had $275.5 million in revenues, $236.4 million in expenditures, $1,003.2 million in total assets, $424.9 million in total liabilities, and $305.9 million in cash and investments.

The Parkland Health & Hospital System (Dallas County Hospital District) operates the E. Carlyle Smith, Jr. Health Center in Grand Prairie.

Grand Prairie as of 2012 has 320 municipal police officers.

The city of Grand Prairie is a voluntary member of the North Central Texas Council of Governments association, the purpose of which is to coordinate individual and collective local governments and facilitate regional solutions, eliminate unnecessary duplication, and enable joint decisions.

Federal representation
The Bureau of Prisons (BOP), of the U.S. Department of Justice  runs the Grand Prairie Office Complex on the grounds of the Grand Prairie Armed Forces Reserve Complex. Within the complex the BOP operates the Designation and Sentence Computation Center (DSCC), which calculates federal sentences, keeps track of the statutory "good time" accumulated by inmates and lump sum extra "good time" awards, and detainers. The BOP South Central Office is also on the armed forces complex grounds.

Economy

According to the city's 2018 Comprehensive Annual Financial Report, the top employers in the city were:

Airbus Helicopters, Inc., the U.S. subsidiary of Airbus Helicopters, has its headquarters in Grand Prairie.

In 1978 American Airlines announced that it would move its headquarters from New York City to the Dallas/Fort Worth area. The airline moved its headquarters into two leased office buildings in Grand Prairie. The airline finished moving into its Fort Worth headquarters facility on January 17, 1983, when the airline left its Grand Prairie facility.

Attractions

 In 1997 Lone Star Park opened, where each Memorial Day the Thoroughbred Meeting is held, with seven stakes races worth just over $1 million.
 In 2000 GPX Skate Park was opened next to Lone Star Park, which hosted the 2001 and 2002 X Games trials. They closed in 2005 and were later re-opened in June 2006 by the Grand Prairie Parks and Recreation committee.
 The state-of-the-art The Theatre at Grand Prairie, previously The Verizon Theatre at Grand Prairie, NextStage and Nokia Live, is in Grand Prairie. Numerous concerts and other events are held here throughout the year.
 Prairie Lights is a  seasonal display, featuring more than three million lights on more than 500 lighted displays. Santa's elves, snowmen, reindeer, angels, penguins, stars, lollipops and the world's longest tunnel of lights are just a few of the displays showcased during the 40-day event. It also offers a unique out-of-car experience in Holiday Village midway through the drive with concessions, carousel rides, Santa's Store for shopping, and photos with Santa on Friday, Saturday and Sunday.
 In 1973, Traders Village was opened off of Mayfield Road, and State Highway 360. It describes itself as the largest flea market in Texas, open on weekends from 7 A.M. until dusk. Special events are held there on certain weekends, including a chili cookoff, auto swap-meet, etc.
 The Grand Prairie AirHogs minor league baseball team and their stadium, The Ballpark in Grand Prairie, were established in Grand Prairie in May 2007 and started play in May 2008. The team ceased operations after the 2020 season.
 The historic Uptown Theatre in downtown Grand Prairie, reopened in 2008 after a year of renovations. It is now a playhouse and venue for concerts.
 The National Recreation and Parks Association (NRPA) bestowed its highest national award, the Gold Medal Award, to the Grand Prairie, Texas Parks and Recreation Department at the 2008 NRPA's Congress and Exposition in Baltimore. Grand Prairie, Texas won the award in the population group of 100,000-250,000.  Grand Prairie is once again a finalist for the award in 2016.  Grand Prairie offers some of the best parks and recreation venues in the country.
 Located near I-30 and Beltline Rd, Turner Park became Grand Prairie's Heritage (1st ever) Park back in the 1940s and today it features one of the top Disc Golf courses in North Texas.
Epic Waters Indoor Waterpark is one of the largest indoor waterparks in Texas, and is a first-of-its-kind, opened January 2018 along with a recreation center nearby that opened later that year.
Ripley's Believe It Or Not / Louis Tussaud's Palace of Wax

Education

Primary and secondary schools

Public schools

Most of Grand Prairie's K–12 student population attends schools in the Grand Prairie Independent School District, which serves areas of Grand Prairie in Dallas County. The Mansfield Independent School District serves areas of Grand Prairie in Tarrant County and operates six elementary schools within the Grand Prairie city limits. Other portions of Grand Prairie reside within the Arlington, Cedar Hill, Irving, Mansfield, and Midlothian school districts.

In Texas, school district boundaries do not follow city and county boundaries because all aspects of the school district government apparatus, including school district boundaries, are separated from the city and county government entirely, with the exception of the Stafford Municipal School District in the Houston area.

Grand Prairie Independent School District

Arlington Independent School District

The Arlington ISD has the second highest portion of Grand Prairie's K–12 student population. Six Arlington ISD elementary schools are within the city limits of Grand Prairie. Grand Prairie residents in the Arlington ISD are located generally west of the Dallas-Tarrant County boundary and north of the intersection of Camp Wisdom and Lake Ridge in southwest Grand Prairie. One of the Arlington high schools, James Bowie High, has more Grand Prairie residents than Arlington residents that are students at the school.

Grand Prairie student/residents in the Arlington ISD attend Bowie, Sam Houston, or Lamar High School in the Arlington ISD and their feeder elementary schools and junior high schools.

Mansfield Independent School District

The Mansfield ISD contains the third highest portion of the Grand Prairie's K–12 student population. Grand Prairie residents in the Mansfield ISD are located generally south of the intersection of Camp Wisdom and Lake Ridge, and west of Joe Pool Lake to the Tarrant and Ellis County line in southwest Grand Prairie. Three Mansfield ISD schools, Anna May Daulton Elementary; Louise Cabaniss Elementary; and Cora Spencer Elementary, are currently open within the city limits of Grand Prairie. The Mansfield ISD is the fastest growing ISD in Tarrant County, and the population growth in far southwest Grand Prairie is a major factor in the Mansfield ISD's subsequent growth.

Grand Prairie students/residents in the Mansfield ISD attend Mansfield Timberview High School, Lake Ridge High School or Mansfield High School in the Mansfield ISD or their feeder elementaries and middle schools.

Colleges and universities
Dallas County residents are zoned to Dallas College (formerly Dallas County Community College District or DCCCD). Tarrant County residents are zoned to Tarrant County Junior College. Ellis County residents are zoned to Navarro College.

Infrastructure

Transportation

Interstate highways 20 and 30 run east–west through the northern and southern parts of the city. Texas State Highways Spur 303 (named Pioneer Parkway) and 180 (Main Street) also run east–west in the northern and central portions of the city.

SH 360 runs for almost three miles in the northwestern portion of city; most of the highway runs just west of the city limits in Arlington.

SH 161, named the President George Bush Turnpike, runs north–south through western Grand Prairie. The main lanes were opened in late 2012 with frontage roads open since 2010. Portions of the highway located north of SH 180 are depressed while the portion south of SH 180 runs at-grade then becomes elevated. Frontage roads remain at-grade throughout. The frontage road intersection at Main Street will open sometime in 2013.

Belt Line Road is a major north–south thoroughfare in the city. The section of the road south of Main Street is dual-labelled as FM 1382, which travels south, past I-20 and continues south to Cedar Hill. The section of the road north of Main Street keeps its name, continuing north into Irving.

The city declined membership in 1984. In April 2022, Grand Prairie launched "Via Grand Prairie", an "on-demand, shared public transportation" which connects to DART's West Irving station.

In the era of private operation of passenger trains prior to the onset of the Amtrak era in 1971, Texas and Pacific Railway trains such as the Texas Eagle and the Louisiana Eagle made stops in Grand Prairie, on trips between Fort Worth and Dallas. Amtrak's Texas Eagle (Chicago-San Antonio) makes stops at Dallas Union Station 12 miles to the east.

Notable people

 Larry D. Alexander, artist and writer
 Rodney Anderson, Republican member of the Texas House of Representatives from Grand Prairie (2011–2013); born in Grand Prairie
 Wesley Duke, professional football player
 Selena Gomez, singer, songwriter, and actress
 Ruthe Jackson, council member
 Nets Katz, 2012 Guggenheim Fellow and Professor of Mathematics at Caltech
 Jud Larson, auto racer
 Jennifer McFalls, Olympic gold medalist and American softball coach
 Nikki McKibbin, 3rd place contestant on season 1 of American Idol (d. 2020)
 Billy Miller, actor, Daytime Emmy winner (The Young and the Restless)
 Jeff Okudah, National Football League cornerback for the Detroit Lions
 Hayley Orrantia, actress and singer, raised in Grand Prairie
 Vergil Ortiz Jr., professional welterweight boxer
 Charley Taylor, professional football player
 Eric Vale, voice actor affiliated with Funimation
 Kerry Wood, Major League Baseball pitcher

Notes

References

External links

 

City of Grand Prairie official website
Census Map – Grand Prairie, Texas

 
Cities in Texas
Cities in the Dallas–Fort Worth metroplex
Cities in Dallas County, Texas
Cities in Ellis County, Texas
Cities in Tarrant County, Texas
Populated places established in 1863
1863 establishments in Texas